Polynoncus aeger is a species of hide beetle in the subfamily Omorginae.

References

aeger
Beetles described in 1844